Jhonatan da Silva Pereira or simply Jhonatan  (born January 31, 1989 in Corumbá), is a Brazilian football striker who most recently plays for Tochigi SC in Japan.

External links

 http://www.jhonatan.do.am
 http://www.wix.com/unionsports/jhonatan89
 https://www.youtube.com/jhonatangols
 gremio.net
 CBF
 fussball talente
 zerozero.pt
 sambafoot
 globoesporte
 Официальный сайт

1989 births
Living people
People from Corumbá
Brazilian footballers
Brazilian expatriate footballers
J2 League players
Grêmio Foot-Ball Porto Alegrense players
FC Sheriff Tiraspol players
Tractor S.C. players
Tochigi SC players
Expatriate footballers in Moldova
Expatriate footballers in Japan
Association football forwards
Sportspeople from Mato Grosso do Sul